Let's Dance 2010 was the fifth season of the Swedish version of Strictly Come Dancing. It was broadcast on the Swedish television channel TV4 starting on 8 January 2010 and ending on 26 March 2010.

Couples

Scoring chart

Red numbers indicate the lowest score for each week.
Green numbers indicate the highest score for each week.
 indicates the couple (or couples) eliminated that week.
 indicates the returning couple that finished in the bottom two (or bottom three).
 indicates the returning couple that was the last to be called safe.
 indicates the winning couple.
 indicates the runner-up couple.
 indicates the third place couple.

 The first week didn't eliminate any couple, instead it was announced which three couples who was in the bottom three going into Week 2.
 Since Week 1 was a non-elimination week, Week 2 featured a combined score of both Week 1 and 2, which was used in the final standings.

Average chart

Average dance chart

Highest and lowest scoring performances 
The best and worst performances in each dance according to the judges' marks are as follows:

Dance schedule
The celebrities and professional partners danced one of these routines for each corresponding week.

Week 1: Cha-cha-cha or Waltz
Week 2: Rumba or Tango
Week 3: Jive or Quickstep
Week 4: Paso Doble or Slowfox
Week 5: (Disco Theme) – Cha-cha-cha or Waltz
Week 6: Samba
Week 7: Rumba or Tango
Week 8: (Musical Theme) – Paso Doble or Jive
Week 9: Quickstep or Slowfox + Bonus Dances
Week 10: Salsa and Bugg
Week 11: Jive, Tango or Cha-cha-cha
Week 12: Finals – Quickstep, Bugg, Cha-cha-cha or Salsa and Show Dance

Songs

Week 1
Individual judges scores in charts below (given in parentheses) are listed in this order from left to right: Maria Öhrman, Dermot Clemenger, Ann Wilson and Tony Irving.

Running order

Week 2
Individual judges scores in charts below (given in parentheses) are listed in this order from left to right: Maria Öhrman, Dermot Clemenger, Ann Wilson and Tony Irving.

Running order

Week 3
Individual judges scores in charts below (given in parentheses) are listed in this order from left to right: Maria Öhrman, Dermot Clemenger, Ann Wilson and Tony Irving.

Running order

 Rabih Jaber's partner Maria Lindberg was sidelined with pneumonia and was replaced with dancer Oksana Spichak.

Week 4
Individual judges scores in charts below (given in parentheses) are listed in this order from left to right: Maria Öhrman, Dermot Clemenger, Ann Wilson and Tony Irving.

Running order

Week 5
Individual judges scores in charts below (given in parentheses) are listed in this order from left to right: Maria Öhrman, Dermot Clemenger, Ann Wilson and Tony Irving.

Running order

Week 6
Individual judges scores in charts below (given in parentheses) are listed in this order from left to right: Maria Öhrman, Dermot Clemenger, Ann Wilson and Tony Irving.

Running order

Week 7
Individual judges scores in charts below (given in parentheses) are listed in this order from left to right: Maria Öhrman, Dermot Clemenger, Ann Wilson and Tony Irving.

Running order

Week 8
Individual judges scores in charts below (given in parentheses) are listed in this order from left to right: Maria Öhrman, Dermot Clemenger, Ann Wilson and Tony Irving.

Running order

Week 9
Individual judges scores in charts below (given in parentheses) are listed in this order from left to right: Maria Öhrman, Dermot Clemenger, Ann Wilson and Tony Irving.

Running order

Week 10
Individual judges scores in charts below (given in parentheses) are listed in this order from left to right: Maria Öhrman, Dermot Clemenger, Ann Wilson and Tony Irving.

Running order

Week 11
Individual judges scores in charts below (given in parentheses) are listed in this order from left to right: Maria Öhrman, Dermot Clemenger, Ann Wilson and Tony Irving.

Running order

Week 12
Individual judges scores in charts below (given in parentheses) are listed in this order from left to right: Maria Öhrman, Dermot Clemenger, Ann Wilson and Tony Irving.

Running order

Call-out order
The table below lists the order in which the contestants' fates were revealed. The order of the safe couples doesn't reflect the viewer voting results.

 This couple came in first place with the judges.
 This couple came in last place with the judges.
 This couple came in last place with the judges and was eliminated.
 This couple was in the bottom three, but was not eliminated.
 This couple was eliminated.
 This couple won the competition.
 This couple came in second in the competition.

 The first week didn't eliminate any couple, instead it was announced which three couples who was in the bottom three going into Week 2. The orders for the safe couples wasn't announced, therefore no particular order.

Dance chart

 Highest Scoring Dance
 Lowest Scoring Dance

References
Official website of Let's Dance (Swedish)

2010
TV4 (Sweden) original programming
2010 Swedish television seasons